= Emamzadeh Hamzeh =

- Location in Iran
- Coordinates: 37°24′06″N 48°41′18″E
- Country: Iran
- Province: Ardabil Province
- Time zone: UTC+3:30 (IRST)
  - Summer (DST): UTC+4:30 (IRDT)

Emamzadeh Hamzeh is a village in the Ardabil Province of Iran.
